Tilefishes are mostly small perciform marine fish comprising the family Malacanthidae. They are usually found in sandy areas, especially near coral reefs.

Commercial fisheries exist for the largest species, making them important food fish. However, the U.S. Food and Drug Administration warns pregnant or breastfeeding women against eating tilefish and some other fish due to mercury contamination.
 Exceptionally colorful smaller species of tilefish are favored for aquariums.

Taxonomic issues 
The family is further divided into two subfamilies: Latilinae, sometimes called the Branchiosteginae, and Malacanthinae. Some authors regard these subfamilies as two evolutionarily distinct families.

The placement of this family within the Eupercaria is still not certain. The 5th Edition of Fishes of the World classifies them within the Perciformes but in a grouping of seven families which may have a relationship to Acanthuroidei, Monodactylidae, and Priacanthidae. while other authorities place it outside the Perciformes, at an order level but with its true relationships being incertae sedis.

Subfamilies and genera
The following two subfamilies and five genera are classified within the family Malacanthidae, in total it contains 45 species.

 subfamily Latilinae Gill, 1862
 genus Branchiostegus Rafinesque, 1815
 genus Caulolatilus Gill, 1862
 genus Lopholatilus Goode & Bean, 1879
 subfamily Malacanthinae Poey, 1861
 genus Hoplolatilus Günther 1887
 genus Malacanthus Cuvier 1829

Description

The two subfamilies appear to be morphologically different, with members of the Latilinae having deeper bodies bearing predorsal ridge and heads rounded to squarish in profile. In contrast, members of the Malacanthinae are more slender with elongated bodies lacking predorsal ridge and rounded head. They also differ ecologically, with latilines typically occurring below 50 m and malacanthines shallower than 50 m depth.

Both subfamilies have long dorsal and anal fins, the latter having one or two spines. The gill covers (opercula) have one spine which may be sharp or blunt; some species also have a cutaneous ridge atop the head. The tail fin may range in shape from truncated to forked. Most species are fairly low-key in colour, commonly shades of yellow, brown, and gray. Notable exceptions include three small, vibrant Hoplolatilus species: the purple sand tilefish (H. purpureus), Starck's tilefish (H. starcki), and the redback sand tilefish (H. marcosi).

Tilefish larvae are notable for their elaborate spines. The family name Malacanthidae, is based on the type genus Malacanthus which is a compound of the Greek words malakos meaning "soft" and akanthos meaning "thorn", possibly derived from the slender, flexible spines in the dorsal fin of Malacanthus plumieri.

Habitat and diet 
Generally shallow-water fish, tilefish are usually found at depths of 50–200 m in both temperate and tropical waters of the Atlantic, Pacific, and Indian Oceans. All species seek shelter in self-made burrows, caves at the bases of reefs, or piles of rock, often in canyons or at the edges of steep slopes. Either gravelly or sandy substrate may be preferred, depending on the species.

Most species are strictly marine; an exception is found in the blue blanquillo (Malacanthus latovittatus) which is known to enter the brackish waters of Papua New Guinea's Goldie River.

Tilefish feed primarily on small benthic invertebrates, especially crustaceans such as crab and shrimp. Mollusks, worms, sea urchins, and small fish are also taken.

After the 1882 mass die-off, great northern tilefish were thought to be extinct until a large number were caught in 1910 near New Bedford, Massachusetts.

Behaviour and reproduction 

Active fish, tilefish keep to themselves and generally stay at or near the bottom. They rely heavily on their keen eyesight to catch their prey. If approached, the fish quickly dive into their constructed retreats, often head-first. The chameleon sand tilefish (Hoplolatilus chlupatyi) relies on its remarkable ability to rapidly change colour (with a wide range) to evade predators.

Many species form monogamous pairs, while some are solitary in nature (e.g., ocean whitefish, Caulolatilus princeps), and others colonial. Some species, such as the rare pastel tilefish (Hoplolatilus fronticinctus) of the Indo-Pacific, actively builds large rubble mounds above which they school and in which they live. These mounds serve as both refuge and as a microecosystem for other reef species.

The reproductive habits of tilefish are not well studied. Spawning occurs throughout the spring and summer; all species are presumed not to guard their broods. Eggs are small  and made buoyant by oil. The larvae are pelagic and drift until the fish have reached the juvenile stage.

Timeline
The relative extant of Branchiostegus in the archeological record:

Health effects 

Tilefish from the Gulf of Mexico have been shown to have high levels of mercury, and the FDA has recommended against their consumption by pregnant women. Atlantic Ocean tilefish may have lower levels of mercury and may be safer to consume.

Gallery

References

Further reading

External links

 

 

Commercial fish